Semisalsa galilaea is a species of small brackish water snail with a gill and an operculum,  an aquatic gastropod mollusk in the family Cochliopidae. The species is endemic to the edge of the Sea of Galilee in Israel.

References

Gastropods described in 1913
Sea of Galilee
Cochliopidae
Gastropods of Asia
Invertebrates of Israel